Ange Mutsinzi (born 15 November 1997) is a Rwandan football defender who plays for Norwegian club Jerv.

Club career
On 6 September 2021, he signed with Portuguese club Trofense.

On 7 February 2023, Mutsinzi signed a two-year contract with Jerv in Norway.

International career
He was a squad member for the 2020 African Nations Championship.

References 

1997 births
People from Muhanga District
Living people
Rwandan footballers
Rwanda A' international footballers
Rwanda international footballers
Association football defenders
Rayon Sports F.C. players
APR F.C. players
C.D. Trofense players
FK Jerv players
Rwanda National Football League players
Liga Portugal 2 players
2020 African Nations Championship players
Rwandan expatriate footballers
Expatriate footballers in Portugal
Rwandan expatriate sportspeople in Portugal
Expatriate footballers in Norway
Rwandan expatriate sportspeople in Norway